Baghjeghaz-e Olya (also Romanized as Bāghjeghāz-e ‘Olyā; also known as Baghchehqāz-e Bālā and Bāghjeghāz-e Bālā) is a village in Qaflankuh-e Sharqi Rural District, Kaghazkonan District, Meyaneh County, East Azerbaijan Province, Iran. At the 2006 census, its population was 306, in 83 families.

References 

Populated places in Meyaneh County